The J.J. Giltinan Shield is an Australian rugby league trophy, awarded annually to the National Rugby League minor premiers. It was named after James J. Giltinan who was central to the founding of rugby league in Australia. Giltinan died in 1950 and the Shield was created for the following season in his honour, first introduced for the 1951 New South Wales Rugby Football League season. From 1951, the Shield was awarded to the winner of the New South Wales Rugby League (NSWRL) Grand Final, replacing the Labor Daily Cup.  In addition to the Shield, premiership winning teams received the W. D. & H. O. Wills Cup from 1960 to 1981, the Winfield Cup from 1982 to 1995, and the Optus Cup in 1996. Since 1997 the J.J. Giltinan Shield has been awarded to the competition's minor premiers.

Winners

1 The Melbourne Storm were stripped of the 2006, 2007 and 2008 minor premierships on 22 April 2010 due to salary cap breaches.

See also

References

External links
NSWRL Premiership at rleague.com

Rugby league trophies and awards
Rugby league in Australia
National Rugby League